Pakowhai is a small settlement in the Hastings District and Hawke's Bay Region of New Zealand's North Island. It is a located between Napier and Hastings, north of the Ngaruroro River.

Mission Estate Winery established its first vineyard in Hawke's Bay at Pakowhai in 1851.

The Pakowhai Regional Park is located on the river's south bank. It is a country park, with dog-walking areas and agility features. It hosts community planting days, and attracts kaka from inland mountains.

A new petrol station was controversially proposed for the area in 2019.

Pakowhai was inundated by flooding during Cyclone Gabrielle in 2023 after the Ngaruroro River burst it's banks. Dozen of houses were destoyed.

Demographics

Omahu-Pakowhai had a population of 1,434 at the 2018 New Zealand census, an increase of 342 people (31.3%) since the 2013 census, and an increase of 273 people (23.5%) since the 2006 census. There were 429 households, comprising 774 males and 660 females, giving a sex ratio of 1.17 males per female. The median age was 39.8 years (compared with 37.4 years nationally), with 276 people (19.2%) aged under 15 years, 282 (19.7%) aged 15 to 29, 666 (46.4%) aged 30 to 64, and 210 (14.6%) aged 65 or older.

Ethnicities were 61.9% European/Pākehā, 37.9% Māori, 8.6% Pacific peoples, 1.3% Asian, and 2.1% other ethnicities. People may identify with more than one ethnicity.

The percentage of people born overseas was 14.0, compared with 27.1% nationally.

Although some people chose not to answer the census's question about religious affiliation, 47.3% had no religion, 38.1% were Christian, 6.1% had Māori religious beliefs, 0.8% were Hindu, 0.6% were Muslim, 0.6% were Buddhist and 1.9% had other religions.

Of those at least 15 years old, 174 (15.0%) people had a bachelor's or higher degree, and 240 (20.7%) people had no formal qualifications. The median income was $27,900, compared with $31,800 nationally. 159 people (13.7%) earned over $70,000 compared to 17.2% nationally. The employment status of those at least 15 was that 648 (56.0%) people were employed full-time, 195 (16.8%) were part-time, and 51 (4.4%) were unemployed.

Education

References

Hastings District
Populated places in the Hawke's Bay Region